Messenger was a sternwheel steamboat of the Puget Sound Mosquito Fleet.

Career
Messenger was built in 1876 at Tumwater, Washington.  The vessel had separate cabins for men and women, and worked in the south Puget Sound area, sometimes in competition with Zephyr.  Messenger was destroyed by fire in 1907 while docked at Tacoma.

References
 Findlay, Jean Cammon and Paterson, Robin, Mosquito Fleet of Southern Puget Sound, (2008) Arcadia Publishing 

1876 ships
Steamboats of Washington (state)
Passenger ships of the United States
Sternwheelers of Washington (state)